Donna L. Weinbrecht (born April 23, 1965) won the first gold medal awarded in the first Olympic mogul competitions in freestyle skiing, which were held at the 1992 Winter Olympics in Albertville, France. Weinbrecht grew up in West Milford, New Jersey. She was also World Champion in 1991 and a five-time World Cup moguls season champion (1990–92, 1994, and 1996).

She was born in Hoboken, New Jersey and attended West Milford High School, where she formed the school's first ski team.

Weinbrecht's first sport was figure skating. While she was a competent skater, her family couldn't afford the cost of coaching. She learned to ski at Hidden Valley in Vernon Township, New Jersey and Vernon Valley / Great Gorge and spent most weekends skiing at Hidden Valley with her family. The family now invested in skiing bought a house in Killington Vermont and Donna trained on the Mogul trails of Killington, especially The Great mogul trail Outer Limits . Donna can still be seen at Killington regularly hosting mogul training camps and recreational skiing .

References

External links
 FIS-ski.com - results - Donna Weinbrecht - 1988-2002
 FIS-ski.com - World Cup season standings - Donna Weinbrecht - 1988-2002

Olympic gold medalists for the United States in freestyle skiing
Freestyle skiers at the 1992 Winter Olympics
Freestyle skiers at the 1994 Winter Olympics
Freestyle skiers at the 1998 Winter Olympics
Olympic freestyle skiers of the United States
American female freestyle skiers
Sportspeople from Hudson County, New Jersey
People from West Milford, New Jersey
Living people
1965 births
Medalists at the 1992 Winter Olympics
Sportspeople from Passaic County, New Jersey
21st-century American women